Lower Tenthill is a rural locality in the Lockyer Valley Region, Queensland, Australia.

Geography 
Agriculture has developed along Tenthill Creek which also forms part of both the south-western and north-eastern boundary of Lower Tenthill.  Lower Tenthill Weir on Tenthill Creek, has a storage capacity of 70 ML and is used for the purpose of recharging groundwater supplies.  The northern boundary follows Lockyer Creek. Two other creeks cross the area - Ma Ma Creek and Deep Creek. The locality is within the North East Coast drainage basin.

The Gatton-Helidon Road runs just inside part of the northern boundary. The Gatton–Clifton Road (State Route 80) passes through from north to west.

History 
The name Tenthill is comes from the name of a pastoral property established by 1845 by Phillip Friell.

Tent Hill State School opened in 1873. It was renamed Tent Hill Lower State School in 1876. However it was unofficially known as Lower Tent Hill State School.

Education 

Tent Hill Lower State School is a government primary (Prep-6) school for boys and girls at 90 Lower Tenthill Road. In 2017, the school had an enrolment of 66 students with 6 teachers (5 full-time equivalent) and 5 non-teaching staff (2 full-time equivalent). In 2018, the school had an enrolment of 69 students with 5 teachers and 6 non-teaching staff (3 full-time equivalent).

There are no secondary schools in Lower Tenthill. The nearest government secondary school is Lockyer District State High School in neighbouring Gatton to the north-east.

References

Lockyer Valley Region
Localities in Queensland